Saghravan (also Romanized as Sāghravān and Sāghravan; also known as Qarvān and Sāqravān) is a village in Miyan Velayat Rural District, in the Central District of Mashhad County, Razavi Khorasan Province, Iran. At the 2006 census, its population was 2,312, in 519 families.

References 

Populated places in Mashhad County